Prostitution in Djibouti is illegal but tolerated. UNAIDS estimate there are 2,900 prostitutes in the country. Many work from bars and nightclubs. There is a red-light district in Djibouti City.

Due to its strategic position, troops from United States, China, France, Japan, Saudi Arabia, Italy. Russia, Spain, Germany and the United Kingdom are stationed in bases in Djibouti. The presence of these troops increase the demand for prostitution. During an investigation in 2015, it was found almost half of the Engineering Department of the Tennessee Army National Guard had used prostitutes whilst stationed in Djibouti.

During World War I, the French set up military brothels for their troops. These continued for the use of the Foreign Legion until 1978.

HIV prevalence amongst sex workers in the country is 12.9%.

Sex trafficking

Djibouti is a source, transit, and destination country for women and children subjected to sex trafficking, although limited data on trafficking cases has complicated efforts to determine the full scope of the phenomenon. Men, women, and children, primarily from Ethiopia and Somalia, and to a lesser extent from Eritrea, transit Djibouti voluntarily en route to Yemen and other locations in the Middle East, particularly Saudi Arabia, to seek work. An unknown number of these migrants are subjected to sex trafficking in their intended destinations.

Djiboutian and migrant women and street children are vulnerable to sex trafficking in Djibouti City, the Ethiopia-Djibouti trucking corridor, and Obock, the main departure point for Yemen. Some migrants intending to be smuggled may be transported or detained against their will and subsequently subjected to trafficking and other forms of abuse in Djibouti. Some migrant women reportedly were subjected to domestic servitude and forced prostitution in Djibouti.

The 2016 Law No. 133, On the Fight Against Trafficking in Persons and Illicit Smuggling of Migrants, criminalizes all forms of trafficking; it prescribes penalties of five to 10 years imprisonment, and 20 when aggravating factors are present, which are sufficiently stringent and commensurate with those for other serious crime.

The United States Department of State Office to Monitor and Combat Trafficking in Persons ranks Djibouti as a 'Tier 2' country.

References

Society of Djibouti
Djibouti
Djibouti
Women's rights in Djibouti
Human rights in Djibouti
Social issues in Djibouti